Ruben Darío Delgado Temesio (born December 3, 1969 in Durazno), known as Darío Delgado, is a former Uruguayan footballer.

Club career
Delgado spent most of his career in Uruguay playing for Montevideo Wanderers in the Primera División Uruguaya. He also had a spell with Ionikos in Greece, where he went a few months without being paid.

International career
Delgado made one appearance for the senior Uruguay national football team in 1994: a friendly match against Peru (0-1 win) in the Estadio Nacional José Díaz in Lima, Peru. He was a substitute for Marcelo Otero in the 69th minute.

References

 

1969 births
Living people
Uruguayan footballers
Uruguay international footballers
Uruguayan expatriate footballers
Montevideo Wanderers F.C. players
Danubio F.C. players
Rampla Juniors players
Albacete Balompié players
Expatriate footballers in Paraguay
Ionikos F.C. players
Club Guaraní players
Expatriate footballers in Greece
Association football midfielders